Mark Herbert Williamson  is Professor Emeritus of Biology at the University of York, England. He is an expert on biological invasions.

Williamson attended Christ Church, University of Oxford where he gained a BA degree in 1950 and received a D.Phil. in 1958, having been a Departmental Demonstrator in the Department of Zoology, University of Oxford since 1952.

Between 1958 and 1962, Williamson was a Senior/Principal Scientific Officer (SSO/PSO) at the Oceanographic Laboratory of the Scottish Marine Biological Association. Between 1962 and 1965, he was a Lecturer at the Department of Zoology at Edinburgh University. In 1963, he was appointed Professor at the University of York on its founding. He was Head of Department in the Department of Biology at York from 1963 until 1984.

In 1993, Mark Williamson was appointed professor emeritus. In 1994, he received an OBE in the 1994 New Year Honours.

Books
 Williamson, Mark (1972). The Analysis of Biological Populations. Edward Arnold, London. 
 Williamson, Mark (1981). Island Populations. Oxford University Press, Oxford. 
 Williamson, Mark (1996). Biological Invasions. Chapman & Hall, London. 
 Williamson, Mark; White, David, eds. (2013). A History of the First Fifty Years of Biology at York.  Department of Biology, University of York. (PDF)

References

External links
 Mark H. Williamson home page

Year of birth missing (living people)
Living people
Place of birth missing (living people)
Alumni of Christ Church, Oxford
20th-century British biologists
21st-century British biologists
Academics of the University of Edinburgh
Academics of the University of York
Officers of the Order of the British Empire